Gunnerkrigg Court is a science-fantasy webcomic created by Tom Siddell and launched in April 2005. It is updated online three days a week, and eight volumes of the still continuing comic have been published in print format by Archaia Studios Press and Titan Books (in the United Kingdom and Ireland). The comic has been critically acclaimed and has won numerous Web Cartoonists' Choice Awards, as well as receiving positive reviews for its artwork and storytelling.

The comic tells the story of Antimony Carver, a young girl who has just started attending a school at a strange and mysterious place called Gunnerkrigg Court, and the events that unfold around her as she becomes embroiled in political intrigues between Gunnerkrigg Court and the inhabitants of the Gillitie Wood, a forest outside the school. The comic's style and themes include elements from science, fantasy creatures, mythology from a variety of traditions, and alchemical symbols and theories; the literary style is heavily influenced by mystery fiction and manga.

Production
Gunnerkrigg Court was first posted online on 4 April 2005, and was originally updated two days per week. The comic began updating three days per week on 25 December 2006. The end of the seventh chapter in May 2006 marked the end of the "first book," which Siddell published through Lulu.com in 2007; that book is no longer in print. In August 2008, Tom Siddell explained that the comic had a standard "comic book format" which was useful when he had sufficient pages to print a hard copy. The first fourteen chapters of the webcomic were printed as the first Archaia Studios Press edition of 296 pages bound in a hardcover collection titled "Orientation".
In 2012 Siddell announced that he had quit his regular job to work on the comic full-time. In addition to books and merchandising the comic is supported through crowdfunding via Patreon since July 2014.

Format
The Gunnerkrigg Court webcomic is told in a series of episodic chapters such that each, while forming part of the overall storyline, also functions individually as a stand-alone story arc. The themes and topics of the chapters vary widely: as one reviewer describes, "You are also not subjected to 400-plus pages of intricate plot movement. While there is an overall story arc, there are also lighter chapters that focus on unusual classes ... or small moments that build the main characters."  Each chapter begins with a title page and ends with one or more "bonus pages," which are not integral to the main storyline but often offer ancillary details about the world of Gunnerkrigg Court or about minor characters.  The chapters have varied in length from one page to more than eighty. Each page is drawn in traditional (A4; 210 × 297 mm) page format and divided arbitrarily into frames. At the bottom of the most recent page is a link to a comments thread for that page, in which readers may comment on and discuss that day's comic.

Influences
Siddell has stated that he enjoyed reading Alfred Hitchcock & The Three Investigators as a child, and that it has heavily influenced the literary style of his comic. His artistic style is influenced by many artists, among which he cites as his favorites Jamie Hewlett, Yukito Kishiro, and Mike Mignola, as well as the manga Nausicaä of the Valley of the Wind and Dragon Ball.

One notable feature of the comic is the blending of mythological elements from many different cultural traditions, especially from the British Isles and Native American mythology. Siddell attributes this style to his experience as a child: "I moved about a lot when I was younger and had the opportunity to grow up hearing stories from different parts of the world and I've always been fascinated by them." In addition to mythology, Siddell makes heavy use of alchemical themes; for example, the main character is named Antimony, after a toxic chemical element, and many pages feature artistic depictions of alchemical symbols. The symbol for antimony appears frequently in Gunnerkrigg Court: the character Antimony wears a necklace shaped like that symbol, the character Reynardine has the symbol imprinted on his wolf body, and the symbol is used to mark the end of a chapter.

The artwork of Gunnerkrigg Court has been described as "stylized," with simple character designs. At least one reviewer, on the other hand, has noticed that the backgrounds, in contrast to the characters, are often very elaborate. The comic has also been described as having a "rich" look in spite of its limited color palette, and Siddell himself has stated that he first developed the idea for the comic using only a limited number of colors. The pieces of artwork that Siddell has posted at the end of each printed book, entitled "Treatise"(s), demonstrate many such of Siddell's artistic and storytelling motifs: they integrate alchemical symbols, mythological figures, nature, and technology.

Synopsis

Setting

Gunnerkrigg Court is set somewhere in the United Kingdom or a country that resembles it. The titular institution functions as a boarding school, but also occupies a vast area, some of it seemingly uninhabited, some used as industrial or research facilities, and some occupied by students and staff. The Annan Waters separate the Court from Gillitie Wood, which is inhabited by "etheric" or magical creatures. Chief among them are Coyote and Ysengrin, along with populations of forest animals, elves, fairies, and others. At the time the story begins, both sides enforce a kind of truce and strict separation between the Court and Forest, although there is an established tradition of some forest creatures transferring into human bodies to attend the Court, and a few Court denizens – notably an ambassador called the medium – are allowed to enter the Forest.

Many characters suspect that the Court is much more than just a school. The school appears to actively recruit many talented or extraordinary students. As the story progresses, it is soon revealed that the school is inhabited by a wide variety of both supernatural creatures – many of which become characters involved in the story's plot – and ultra-modern technology. One character explains that "the Court was founded on a union between technological and etheric design." Another describes it as "man's endeavor to become god." The house system described at the end of the first chapter is similar to that used by many UK schools, including the one the author attended; Siddell has even stated that the school in which Gunnerkrigg Court takes place is modeled after his own secondary school.

Plot
The main story of Gunnerkrigg Court revolves around Antimony “Annie” Carver, a student at the Court. Annie's parents, Surma and Anthony Carver, were also students there decades earlier, and Surma became the Court's medium to the Forest. Surma died after a long illness and Anthony disappeared, leaving Annie in the Court's care. Early in the comic, Annie befriends several supernatural beings, including a sentient shadow, a robot, and a ghost named Mort. Though initially not well liked by most of her fellow students, she becomes best friends with Katerina “Kat” Donlan, a classmate and robotics prodigy, and eventually also befriends older students Parley and Smitty.

Annie meets a creature called Reynardine, who tries to take over her body but, by accident, instead becomes trapped in the body of a stuffed animal she carries and becomes subject to her command. She gradually learns from various characters the history of the Forest and its connection to her own family. In the past, Coyote had granted some of his powers to Reynardine and Ysengrin: he had given Ysengrin "power over the trees" and Reynardine the power to take bodies. Reynardine had been in love with Surma and had used his power to steal a young man's body and woo Surma; the man died, however, and Reynardine was imprisoned in the Court until Annie encountered him. Surma was a psychopomp and the descendant of a fire spirit: she had an etheric power over fire, which is passed from mother to daughter at the cost of the mother's life.

Because of her relationship with Reynardine, Coyote, and Ysengrin, Annie is nominated to receive training as a medium, developing her etheric abilities including fire manipulation and astral projection. In the end, the position is given to Smitty instead, but Coyote designates her as the Forest's medium to the Court. She begins training under Ysengrin, who she learns is in a constant state of anger towards the Court but is partially brainwashed and kept in check by Coyote. Meanwhile, Anthony suddenly returns to the Court as a professor, and behaves coldly toward his daughter, moving her to a separate residence and making her repeat a school year. Annie later learns that the court is displeased by her closeness with the forest creatures and brought him back in an attempt to control her. Trying to control her rage at these events, she severs the link to her emotions and fire powers.

Annie and Kat investigate a powerful presence that guards the Annan Waters between the Court and the Forest. It turns out to be the ghost of a woman named Jeanne, one of the founders of the Court. Another founder named Diego created an arrow that killed Jeanne's lover and trapped her soul in the river, where she resisted attempts from the psychopomps to collect her soul and kills all who attempt to cross the river without the bridge. Annie, Kat, and several friends mount an expedition to recover the arrow and free the souls of Jeanne and her lover; they succeed, but Smitty is mortally wounded by Jeanne. Annie strikes a deal with the psychopomps in which they spare Smitty's life in exchange for her commitment to become a psychopomp in the future. As preparation, Annie and Kat help Mort finally pass into the ether.

Coyote, aware that the river can now be crossed freely, cedes his strength to Ysengrin, who is suddenly overwhelmed by rage and devours Coyote, becoming a creature named Loup. Loup destroys the Annan Waters, creates a duplicate version of Annie, and attacks the Court, which temporarily fends him off while preparing evacuation plans. Annie meets with Loup several times, while the Court attempts to capture him; Coyote appears several times during these encounters and suggests that all of Loup's actions were part of his plan, and that he will eventually return after Loup is killed by Annie.

In addition to Annie's central story, the story includes several additional plot arcs interspersed with the main story. One concerns two girls from the Court, Zimmy and Gamma, who communicate with one another telepathically. Zimmy sees hallucinations of monsters that her etheric abilities turn into reality, which she relies on Gamma to dispel. Kat has her own storylines, including her romance with a fellow student named Paz, and experiments in robotics inspired by natural bodies and the highly complex robots created by Diego. Kat is eventually able to create full organic bodies for robots that make them capable of sensation, and a faction of robots seemingly starts a religion centered on the belief that she is an angel with the gift of giving robots life.

Main characters

Reception
In addition to being officially recognized at the Web Cartoonists' Choice Awards, Gunnerkrigg Court has been critically acclaimed in a number of online reviews, and has a large readership and an active forum.  Author Tom Siddell has been interviewed about his work numerous times, mostly by non-mainstream online magazines such as ComixTalk. Kevin Powers of the Comics Bulletin and Graphic Smash listed Gunnerkrigg Court as one of the series he "respect[s]," and ComixTalk (then called Comixpedia) listed Siddell as one of the twenty-five "People of Webcomics" in 2006.

The comic has received praise for its artwork and use of color, dark mood, slowly revealed mysteries, and pacing. Al Schroeder of ComixTalk has called Gunnerkrigg Court's setting "marvelous" and "unique," and said the comic is "delightfully fun" in spite of its moody backdrop. Along with the evolution in art style since the start of the comic, many reviewers have praised the age progression of the protagonists and their maturation with the plot, likening it to that of Harry Potter.

Some reviewers, on the other hand, have criticized its, at times, dark and sad tone as potentially being frightening for younger audiences, also noting that there can be "lots [of information] to take in at times."

In 2006, science fiction author Neil Gaiman praised Gunnerkrigg Court in his blog, which brought the comic to the attention of many more readers.

Awards
Gunnerkrigg Court has been nominated for and has won a number of Web Cartoonist's Choice Awards, shown in the table below. When the Web Cartoonists' Choice Awards were discontinued in 2008 and replaced by The Webcomic List Awards (run by The Webcomic List Community) in 2009, it won several of those as well. It was also nominated in 2006 for a Clickie award in the "International Clickie" category at Stripdagen Haarlem, a webcomics festival in the Netherlands. Gunnerkrigg Court: Orientation won a 2008 gold Book of the Year Award from ForeWord magazine in their graphic novel category. Gunnerkrigg Court: Orientation won a 2009 Cybils Award in the graphic novel category. Gunnerkrigg Court was nominated for the 2014 Harvey Award for Best Online Comics Work.

Books

Side comics

Notes

Explanatory footnotes

References

Story notes

External links

Gunnerkrigg Court
Gunnerkrigg Court official forum

2000s webcomics
2010s webcomics
2005 webcomic debuts
Archaia Studios Press titles
Boom! Studios titles
British webcomics
Coming-of-age webcomics
Science fantasy webcomics
Comics about animals
Comics about foxes
Comics about women
School webcomics
LGBT-related webcomics
Long-form webcomics
Titan Books titles
Web Cartoonists' Choice Award winners
Webcomics in print